Sadness is an emotion associated with loss and grief.

Sad may also refer to:

Geography
 Sad, Oman, a village in Oman
 Sad, Podlaskie Voivodeship, a village in Poland
 Sad, Dnipropetrovsk Oblast, an urban settlement in Ukraine

Language
 Ṣād, a letter of the Arabic alphabet
 Sandawe language (ISO 639 language code: sad), spoken in Tanzania
 Sad (surah), the thirty-eighth sura of the Qur'an

Music
 "Sad!", a song by XXXTentacion from the album ?
 "Sad" (Elton John and Pnau song), on the album Good Morning to the Night
 "Sad" (Maroon 5 song), on the album Overexposed
 "Sad", a song by Bebe Rexha from the album Expectations
 "Sad", a song by Bo Burnham from the album what.
 "Sad", a song by Chico Rose featuring Afrojack
 "Sad", a song by Linkin Park on the album LP Underground 9: Demos
 "Sad", a song from the Pearl Jam album Lost Dogs

Other
 #Sad!: Doonesbury in the Time of Trump, a collection of Doonesbury comic strips

See also
 SAD (disambiguation)
 Sad Song (disambiguation)